Khaled Toukan is the current chairman of the Jordan Atomic Energy Commission, he served previously as the Minister of Energy for the Hashemite Kingdom of Jordan (2011), Minister of Education (2000-2008), and as Minister of Higher Education and Scientific Research (2001–2002).

Academic career
Toukan was the president of Al-Balqa` Applied University from (1997–2001). He also held the position of Acting Dean of Faculty of Engineering & Technology and Professor of Industrial Engineering at the University of Jordan, currently he is a member of the university's Board of Trustees, Research Scientist at Karlsruhe Institute of Technology, and Associate Research Scientist at the King Fahd University of Petroleum and Minerals, Saudi Arabia.

Toukan is a Member of the International High-Level EFA Group, a member of H.M. King Abdullah II Economic Consultative Council, Acting Director of SESAME, and the Jordan representative to SESAME Council and Vice –Chairman.

Ministerial roles

Awards
Toukan's awards include the UNESCO Gandhi Medal of Peace, (2003), the Royal Grand Gordon of Alkukab Al-Urduni, (2003), the Theos, J, Thompson Fellowship (1980–81) in the Department of Nuclear Engineering at M.I.T., and the Deutscher Akademischer Austauschdienst.

Life
Born in Amman in 1954, Toukan is married with 3 children. He holds a Ph.D. in Nuclear Engineering from the Massachusetts Institute of Technology, (1978–1982), an M.Sc. degree in Nuclear Engineering from University of Michigan, (1976–1978), and a B.E. degree in Electrical Engineering from American University of Beirut, (1971–1976).

References

External links
 Prime Ministry of Jordan website

1954 births
Living people
Khaled
Academic staff of the University of Jordan
Academic staff of Al-Balqa` Applied University
Academic staff of the Karlsruhe Institute of Technology
Academic staff of King Fahd University of Petroleum and Minerals
International Centre for Synchrotron-Light for Experimental Science Applications in the Middle East people
MIT School of Engineering alumni
University of Michigan College of Engineering alumni
American University of Beirut alumni
Government ministers of Jordan
Education ministers of Jordan
Higher education ministers of Jordan
Energy ministers of Jordan